Jambo Caribe is an album by trumpeter Dizzy Gillespie recorded in 1964 and released on the Limelight label.

Reception
The Allmusic review states "The populist Dizzy Gillespie gets full rein in this lively, happy collection of tunes exploring rhythms and idioms from the Caribbean. Gillespie is in an ebullient mood, even offering some sly lead calypso vocals on three numbers".

Track listing
All compositions by Dizzy Gillespie except as indicated
 "Fiesta Mo-Jo" - 3:50 
 "Barbados Carnival" (Chris White) - 2:55 
 "Jambo" - 4:57 
 "Trinidad, Hello" (Kenny Barron) - 4:20 
 "Poor Joe" (Joe Willoughby) - 2:38 
 "And Then She Stopped" - 3:15 
 "Don't Try to Keep up with the Joneses" (Willoughby) - 2:36 
 "Trinidad, Goodbye" (Barron) - 8:26 
Recorded at Universal Studios in Chicago, Illinois on November 4 (tracks 2 & 6), November 5 (tracks 3-5) and November 6 (tracks 1, 7 & 8), 1964

Personnel
Dizzy Gillespie - trumpet, vocals
James Moody - tenor saxophone, flute
Kenny Barron - piano
Chris White - bass, vocals
Rudy Collins - drums
Kansas Fields - percussion

References 

Dizzy Gillespie albums
1964 albums
Albums produced by Hal Mooney
Limelight Records albums